Tombu-e Bala (also Romanized as Tombū-e Bālā; also known as Tonbū-e Bālā) is a village in Dar Pahn Rural District, Senderk District, Minab County, Hormozgan Province, Iran. At the 2006 census, its population was 349, in 83 families.

References 

Populated places in Minab County